Eleanor Calbes (20 February 1940 – 19 April 2016) was a Filipina soprano. Calbes was the first woman from the Philippines to perform on Broadway, and she performed globally until retiring in September 2012. She was inducted into the Mississauga Music Walk of Fame in 2013.

Early life and education
Calbes was born in Aparri, Cagayan in the Philippines. In 1961, she completed a diploma in education. Calbes was also awarded a scholarship with The Royal Conservatory of Music in Toronto.

Career
Calbes began her opera career with the Bayanihan Philippine National Folk Dance Company before performing with the Canadian Opera Company from 1963 to 1967 and becoming a Canadian citizen. Outside of Canada, Calbes sang in various parts of the world including the United States, Germany and the Philippines. During her career, she appeared in multiple Broadway musicals including South Pacific and West Side Story. She was the first woman from Philippines on Broadway. Calbes ended her singing career in 2012.

Apart from singing, Calbes began directing musicals in 1983 with a production of The King and I and started Mississauga City Centre Opera in 1985. Calbes also opened studios in dance and singing in Mississauga.

Personal life and death
Calbes was married twice. She had a child, actress and producer Lara Wickes with author David A.B. Wickes. The couple divorced and Eleanor married a fellow Canadian opera singer, John Davidson Thomson. 

She died at the age of 76 from cancer.

Awards and honors
In 1996, Calbes was chosen as the best musician of the year for Mississauga. In 2013, Calbes was inducted into the Mississauga Music Walk of Fame. The following year, she won the Laurie Pallett Patron of the Arts award at the 2014 Mississauga Arts Awards.

References

1940 births
2016 deaths
Filipino sopranos
Canadian sopranos